Oberbergischer Kreis is an electoral constituency (German: Wahlkreis) represented in the Bundestag. It elects one member via first-past-the-post voting. Under the current constituency numbering system, it is designated as constituency 99. It is located in southern North Rhine-Westphalia, comprising the Oberbergischer Kreis district.

Oberbergischer Kreis was created for the inaugural 1949 federal election. Since 2017, it has been represented by Carsten Brodesser of the Christian Democratic Union (CDU).

Geography
Oberbergischer Kreis is located in southern North Rhine-Westphalia. As of the 2021 federal election, it is coterminous with the Oberbergischer Kreis district.

History
Oberbergischer Kreis was created in 1949. It was named Oberbergischer Kreis upon its creation, but renamed to Oberbergischer Kreis – Siegkreis II in the 1965 and 1969 elections. In the 1972 and 1976 elections, it was named Oberbergischer Kreis – Rhein-Sieg-Kreis II. It returned to its current name in the 1980 election. In the 1949 election, it was North Rhine-Westphalia constituency 12 in the numbering system. From 1953 through 1961, it was number 71. From 1965 through 1976, it was number 65. From 1980 through 1998, it was number 66. From 2002 through 2009, it was number 100. Since the 2013 election, it has been number 99.

Originally, it was coterminous with the Oberbergischer Kreis district. In the 1965 through 1976 elections, it also contained the entirety of Siegkreis district (Rhein-Sieg-Kreis district from 1972) excluding the modern municipalities of Bad Honnef, Königswinter, Niederkassel, Troisdorf, and Sankt Augustin. It acquired its current borders in the 1980 election.

Members
The constituency has been held by the Christian Democratic Union (CDU) during all but one Bundestag term since 1949. It was first represented by August Dresbach 1949 to 1965, followed by Gustav Stein until 1972. Horst Waffenschmidt was elected in 1972 and served until 1998. The Social Democratic Party (SPD)'s candidate Friedhelm Julius Beucher won the constituency in 1998, but the CDU regained it in 2002. Klaus-Peter Flosbach then represented it until 2017. Carsten Brodesser of the CDU was elected as representative in 2017 and re-elected in 2021.

Election results

2021 election

2017 election

2013 election

2009 election

References

Federal electoral districts in North Rhine-Westphalia
Oberbergischer Kreis
Constituencies established in 1949
1949 establishments in West Germany